Ingmire Hall is a grade II listed 16th century country house built around the remains of a pele tower some 2 miles west of Sedbergh, Cumbria, England.

The house was first erected for the Upton family in the 16th century. It was enlarged in the early 19th century by architect George Webster and extended around 1900. After being partially destroyed by fire in 1928 it was extended again and then partially remodelled in 1989. It is constructed in two storeys of coursed rubble with quoins and covered by slate roofs.

The Ingmire estate was acquired by Roger Upton in the late 16th century, who left it to his son John Upton, MP for Preston, 1667–81. The property eventually descended in the female line to John Upton, MP for Westmorland, 1761-68. It then descended further in the Upton family until it was acquired by Sir John Sutherland Harmood-Banner, High Sheriff of Cheshire (1902), Lord Mayor of Liverpool (1912) and MP for Liverpool Everton for 20 years. After his death in 1927 the hall was gutted by fire but was afterwards restored.

The hall and gardens are still a private residence and are not open to the public. However, there is a public footpath running alongside the driveway to the property.

Upton family
The Upton family founded St Gregory's Church near Sedbergh which was constructed in the 1860s. The family owned much of the land in Sedbergh and the local area.

References

Country houses in Cumbria
Grade II listed houses in Cumbria
Sedbergh